Capitol Mountain is a  summit located in Flathead County of the U.S. state of Montana.

Description

Capitol Mountain is located in the Flathead Range, a subset of the Rocky Mountains. It is situated in the Great Bear Wilderness, on land managed by Flathead National Forest. Union Mountain is set two miles to the east-northeast, and the nearest higher neighbor is Argosy Mountain,  to the southeast. Access to this remote peak is from the nearby Shafer Ranger Station at the Schafer landing strip which was grandfathered with the wilderness designation.

Climate

Based on the Köppen climate classification, Capitol Mountain is located in a subarctic climate zone characterized by long, usually very cold winters, and short, cool to mild summers. Winter temperatures can drop below −10 °F with wind chill factors below −30 °F.

Geology

Capitol Mountain is composed of sedimentary rock laid down during the Precambrian to Jurassic periods.

See also
 Geology of the Rocky Mountains

References

External links
 Weather: Capitol Mountain

Mountains of Flathead County, Montana
Mountains of Montana
North American 2000 m summits
Flathead National Forest